Fist Fight is a 2017 film directed by Richie Keen.

Fistfight or Fist Fight may also refer to:

Fist Fight (TV series), a 2018 Hong Kong TV series
"Fist Fight", a song  by For the Fallen Dreams from the 2011 album Back Burner

See also
The Fist Fighters, characters from the animated TV series Wander Over Yonder
Combat sports, many of which involve fighting with the fists
Pugilism (disambiguation)